"Dream Warriors" is a song by American band Dokken, that was written by members George Lynch & Jeff Pilson for the movie A Nightmare on Elm Street 3: Dream Warriors. The song was released as a single in 1987, charting at number 22 on the Hot Mainstream Rock Tracks chart, and was also released on Dokken's fourth album, Back for the Attack.

Music video

The music video used clips from the movie A Nightmare on Elm Street 3: Dream Warriors, and primarily featured actress Patricia Arquette, and Robert Englund in the role of Freddy Krueger. The video featured various scenes from the film, combined with a small amount of original footage of Arquette's character Kristen being menaced by Freddy Krueger before being rescued by Dokken who drives Freddy off with the power of rock 'n' roll. At the end of the video Freddy wakes up in bed screaming revealing that the video was his nightmare and exclaims, "What a nightmare! Who were those guys?"

The video was ranked as the #1 "Killer '80s Heavy Metal Horror Movie Music [Video]" by VH1 in 2015.

Track listing
In addition to "Dream Warriors," the single contained the songs "Back for the Attack" - a previously unreleased track from the Under Lock and Key album sessions, and "Paris Is Burning," from the album Breaking the Chains.

Charts

Legacy and cover versions
Don Dokken performed the song acoustically at the 30th anniversary event for A Nightmare on Elm Street 3.

In 2018, the song was covered in the episode "Chapter Thirty-Nine: The Midnight Club" from the third season of the television series Riverdale, performed by K.J. Apa, Ashleigh Murray, Camila Mendes and Lili Reinhart.

References

Dokken songs
A Nightmare on Elm Street (franchise) music
Songs written for films
1987 singles
Songs written by George Lynch (musician)
Songs written by Jeff Pilson
Songs about nightmares
Songs about Freddy Krueger